An ektenia (from ; literally, "diligence"), often called by the better known English word litany, consists of a series of petitions occurring in the Eastern Orthodox and Byzantine Catholic liturgies. The prevalent ecclesiastical word for this kind of litany in Greek is συναπτή synaptê, while ektenia is the word preferred in Church Slavonic (ектенїѧ ekteniya).

A litany is normally intoned by a deacon, with the choir or people chanting the responses.  As he concludes each petition, the deacon raises the end of his orarion and crosses himself; if there is no deacon serving, the petitions are intoned by a priest. During many litanies the priest says a prayer silently; after the last petition of the litany, the priest says an ecphonesis  which, when a silent prayer is said during the litany, is the final phrase of that prayer. 

When there is no priest present during the canonical hours, the litanies are not said; rather, the reader replaces them by saying "Lord, have mercy," three, twelve, or forty times, depending on which litany is being replaced.

Overview
The main forms of the litany are:

Great Litany (Greek: Συναπτή μεγάλη/Synaptê Megalê; Slavonic: Ектения великая/Ekteniya Velikaya)--so called not only because of its length, but because of its importance, coming near the beginning of major services such as the Divine Liturgy, Matins, Vespers, Baptism, Great Blessing of Waters, etc. This ektenia is also called the Litany of Peace (Greek: Εἰρηνικά/Eirênika; Slavonic: Мирнаѧ Ектенїѧ/Mirnaya Ekteniya) because of the opening petition: "In peace, let us pray to the Lord."
Litany of Supplication (Slavonic: Ектения просительная/Ekteniya prositelnaya) --so called because most of the petitions end with the deacon saying, "...let us ask of the Lord," to which the choir responds, "Grant [it], O Lord.” (Greek: Παράσχου, Κύριε/Paraskhou, Kyrie; Slavonic: Подаи, Господи/Podai, Ghospodi. In both languages, the verb does not require an object.)
Litany of Fervent Supplication (Slavonic: Ектения сугубая/Ekteniya Sugubaya) also sometimes Impetratory Litany, Augmented Litany, Fervent Litany—this litany is remarkable because of the fervor conveyed in the petitions, and heard audibly in the responses, as indicated by the threefold response of the choir, "Lord, have mercy" (thrice). At the divine liturgy, this litany may also be augmented with special petitions, according to need as the pastor sees fit.
Little Litany (Greek: Αἴτησις/Aitêsis or Μικρὴ Συναπτή/Mikrê Synaptê; Slavonic: Ектения малая/Ektenia Malaya)--so called because of its brevity, being only three petitions long. The Little Litany has elements of the other ektenias in it: the fervency of the Litany of Supplication, and the prayer for peace of the Great Litany, being a brief statement of the faith and hope of the church and often serving as a bridge between parts of the services.
Litany of the Catechumens (Slavonic: Ектения об оглашаемых/Ekteniya ob oglashaemykh)--at the Divine Liturgy, this litany traditionally ended the part of the service which the catechumens were permitted to attend. This litany is composed of several petitions for the catechumens as they prepare for baptism, and concludes with a dismissal of the catechumens, and (in older times) the closing of the doors of the temple to all but baptized members in good standing.
Litany of the Faithful (Slavonic: Ектения о выходе оглашенных/Ekteniya o vykhode oglashennykh)--at the divine liturgy there are a pair of these following the dismissing of the catechumens and commencing the Liturgy of the Faithful, as those remaining prepare for the mystery of Holy Communion. These are unique in that the deacon exclaims, "Wisdom!" before the priest says the ecphonesis.
Special Litanies--litanies that occur only in particular services, usually be in the form of special petitions that are added to the Great Litany (such as at baptism, or the special Kneeling Vespers at Pentecost), or unique litanies that occur in only one service (such as those at Requiem services or Holy Unction).
The Liturgy of the Presanctified Gifts contains the litanies found in the other forms of the divine liturgy, a few being altered for the context of the presanctified. One unique litany during this service is the Ektenia for Those Preparing for Illumination (i.e., for those catechumens in the final stages of preparation for baptism on Pascha).

There is also a special form of litany called a lity (Greek: Λιτή/Litê; Slavonic: Литїѧ, Litiya)  which is intoned at great vespers, consisting of several long petitions, mentioning the names of numerous saints, to which the choir responds with "Lord, have mercy," many times.

Notes

External links
Vespers
Listen to the Great Litany in Slavonic
The Litany before the Lord's Prayer
Hierarchical Divine Liturgy

Byzantine Rite
Litanies